Kalavati 'Kutty' Saramma (born 25 February 1971) is an Indian former athlete who specialized in the 400 metres event. She was also a part of the Indian 4 × 100 metres relay and 4 × 400 metres relay teams. She is a winner of the G. V. Raja Award, which was awarded to her in 1991–92 and in 1993, she was awarded the Arjuna Award by the government of India.

Career
Saramma won the silver medal in the 400 metres event at the 1988 Asian Junior Athletics Championships in Singapore clocking 55.40 seconds in the final. She bettered her timing at the next championships in 1990 in Beijing, clocking 55.07 seconds and winning the bronze in the process.

At the senior level, making her debut in the 1991 Asian Athletics Championships in Kuala Lumpur, Saramma won bronze with a timing of 53.51 seconds. At the 1993 Asian Championships in Manila, she won a bronze again, clocking 52.83 seconds in the final. She was also a part of the Indian 4 × 100 metres and 4 × 400 metres relay teams, that won medals at four consecutive Asian Championships, from 1989 to 1993.
Presently working as Asst.Sports Officer, Southern Railway, Chennai

References

External links
 

1971 births
Living people
Sportswomen from Kerala
Asian Games medalists in athletics (track and field)
Athletes (track and field) at the 1990 Asian Games
Athletes (track and field) at the 1994 Asian Games
Indian female middle-distance runners
20th-century Indian women
20th-century Indian people
Asian Games silver medalists for India
Asian Games bronze medalists for India
Medalists at the 1994 Asian Games
Medalists at the 1990 Asian Games